Rue Verdun, or Verdun Street, is an upscale commercial and residential street in Beirut, Lebanon. The street, which is a major shopping center and tourist attraction, was named in honor of the Battle of Verdun during World War I. It is officially named Rachid Karami Street, after Lebanon's late Prime Minister who was assassinated during the Lebanese Civil War.

Landmarks
 Lycée Franco-Libanais Verdun - one of Beirut's most prominent Francophone schools. 
 The Druze Center - the seat of the High Sheik of the Druze Sect in Lebanon. 
 The "Rashid Karami" memorial statue - the man the street is named after.

Tourism

Verdun is home to a number of hotels, including:

 Four Points by Sheraton has a prime location on the entrance of Rue Verdun. 
 Radisson Blu Hotel Verdun, rising above the bustling Dunes Center. 
 Bristol Hotel, an old-age landmark lying on the intersection of Verdun and Hamra. 
 Staybridge Suites

Verdun is home to some major fashion boutiques and retail chains. The street also has restaurants, cafes and coffee shops. There is little nightlife, with few or no clubs and bars in the area.

Gallery

See also
Beirut Central District
Beirut

Notes and references

Verdun, Rue
Verdun
Tourist attractions in Beirut
Shopping malls in Beirut
Retailing in Lebanon